Tangshan College (唐山学院 Tángshān xuéyuàn) is a college in Hebei, China under the provincial government.
 Also known as "Tangshan University".

http://www.tsc.edu.cn/index.html

Universities and colleges in Hebei